Zuhayr, Zuhair, Zohair, Zuheir, or Zoheir may refer to:

 "King Zoheir", leader of the Banu Abs in the tales of Antarah ibn Shaddad
 Zuhayr bin Abi Sulma, a famous Arabian poet
 Zuhayr ibn Qayn Al-Bajali ( 680), a famous Arabian general martyred at the Battle of Karbala
 Baha' al-din Zuhair (1186–1258), an Arabian poet and calligrapher
 Zuheir Mohsen (1936–1979), pro-Syrian leader in the PLO
 Harek Zoheir, alias of Sofiane el-Fassila (1975–2007), an Algerian terrorist
 Zuhayr Talib Abd al-Sattar al-Naqib, Iraqi director of military intelligence
 Zoheïr Djelloul, Algerian soccer manager

See also
 Ka'b bin Zuhayr, son of Zuhayr bin Abi Sulma